BKM can refer to:
 Buckinghamshire in England — BKM is the Chapman code for that county.
 The BKM algorithm for computing elementary functions based on complex exponentials and logarithms
 BKM algebra, a Lie algebra in mathematics
 Belkommunmash, a Belarusian manufacturer of trolleybus and trams
 Bangladesh Khelafat Majlish
 Best Known Method, an industry synonym for Best practice
 Bezpłatna Komunikacja Miejska in Żory, free city transport in Żory, Poland
 Berkhamsted railway station, Hertfordshire, England (National Rail station code)